The International Treaty on Pandemic Prevention, Preparedness and Response or Pandemic Treaty is a proposed international agreement to strengthen pandemic prevention, preparedness and response. The 194 World Health Organization (WHO) member states agreed in December 2021 to begin negotiations on a global pandemic treaty, aiming for a draft agreement to be finalized by May 2024 for consideration by the 77th World Health Assembly.

Background 
Experts argue that the COVID-19 pandemic has "exposed severe limitations in both the International Health Regulations (IHR) and the WHO’s institutional capacities." In light of the pandemic's global devastation, many states called for a stronger international framework to deal with future pandemics.

Responding to these calls, a special session of the World Health Assembly, the WHO's governing body, convened in November 2021. At this meeting, the WHO member states agreed "to establish (...) an intergovernmental negotiating body open to all Member States and Associate Members (the “INB”) to draft and negotiate a WHO convention, agreement or other international instrument on pandemic prevention, preparedness and response".

The first meeting of the negotiating body is to be scheduled "no later than 1 March 2022" and will aim to "define and agree on its working methods and timelines". The second session will be held "no later than 1 August 2022" and is meant to consider a working draft of the future international agreement. The negotiating body "shall submit its outcome for consideration by the Seventy-seventh World Health Assembly" in 2024.

Treaty format 
There is currently no agreement regarding the legal format of the future pandemic treaty. More than 70 states, including the European Union and United Kingdom, are advocating for a strong legally binding international treaty. In contrast, other countries, including the United States, India and Brazil, are reluctant to commit to a legally binding agreement.

The WHO could adopt a pandemic treaty under Article 21 of its constitution, similar to the legal status of the International Health Regulations. Alternatively, the WHO could adopt a pandemic convention or agreement under Article 19, used only once before for the Framework Convention on Tobacco Control.

Proceedings 
The intergovernmental negotiating body (INB) first met on 24 February 2022.

See also 
 Pandemic prevention
 International Health Regulations

References

External links 

 PandemicTreaty.net, website of the Pandemic Treaty Project by Georgetown University's Center for Global Health Science and Security and Carnegie Corporation of New York

 World Health Assembly, 2nd Special Session Decision (1 December 2021): "The World Together: Establishment of an intergovernmental negotiating body to strengthen pandemic prevention, preparedness and response"
 Meeting documents of the World Health Assembly, 2nd Special Session

World Health Organization treaties
Proposed treaties